{{Infobox musical artist
| name = VrčakВрчакVrchak
| background = solo_singer
| image = 
| image_size = 
| caption = 
| native_name = Раде Врчаковски
| native_name_lang = mkc
| birth_name = Rade Vrčakovski
| alias = Vrčak
| birth_date = 
| birth_place = SR Macedonia, SFR Yugoslavia
| origin = North Macedonia
| genre = Pop-rap, Pop, Trap, Psychedelic trance
| occupation = Singer, songwriter
| instrument = 
| years_active = 1999–2009
| label = 
| associated_acts = Adrian Gaxha
| website = 
}}

Rade Vrčakovski (born 17 November 1980 in Strumica) better known by his stage name Vrčak (Врчак) is a Macedonian singer.

He represented North Macedonia at the Eurovision Song Contest 2008, performing the song "Let Me Love You" along with Tamara Todevska and Adrian Gaxha.

Biography

Internationally, he is known for writing the lyrics for "Ninanajna", the song with which Elena Risteska represented North Macedonia at the 2006 Eurovision song contest. Vrčak is a Medicine student at the University of Cyril and Methodius in Skopje but chose a career in music, following the footsteps of his father. Vrčak's latest album, Vo tvoeto srce, was released in 2006 and was a huge success within North Macedonia, as it was one of the biggest selling albums in the country. Singles from the album received heavy airplay on the Macedonian TV and Radio stations. The album gave him a successful musical come-back, making him one of the most popular artist in North Macedonia.

In 2001, Vrčak performed at Makfest, even though his first album, Kako Da Pobegnam Od Sè, was released in 1999. He performed with Andrijana Janevska and placed third in the competition. In 2004, he performed on Makfest once again, however, this time he had a duet with Robert Bilbilov which landed him the third spot once again, though it was not his last performance at Makfest. In 2006, his duet with Tamara Todevska earned him first place in the competition. Vrčak, along with Tamara Todevska and Adrian Gaxha, represented North Macedonia at the 2008 Eurovision Song Contest, after having won the Macedonian qualifier with the song "Vo Ime Na Ljubovta".

Discography
AlbumsKako Da Pobegnam Od Sè (1999)Vo Tvoeto Srce (2006)Na sedmo nebo'' (2009)

See also
 Music of the Republic of Macedonia
 Macedonian hip hop

References

1980 births
Living people
Eurovision Song Contest entrants for North Macedonia
Macedonian pop singers
Macedonian physicians
Eurovision Song Contest entrants of 2008
People from Strumica